Korean holidays may refer to:
Public holidays in North Korea
Public holidays in South Korea
Traditional Korean holidays; see Korean calendar